Rudny (masculine), Rudnaya (feminine), or Rudnoye (neuter) may refer to:
Rudny, Russia (Rudnaya, Rudnoye), name of several inhabited localities in Russia
Rudny, Kazakhstan, a city in Kostanay Province, Kazakhstan

See also
Rudno (disambiguation)
Rudna (disambiguation)
Rudná (disambiguation)
Besiekierz Rudny, a village in the administrative district of Gmina Zgierz, Poland